The Athletic Federation of Montenegro (Montenegrin Atletski savez Crne Gore) is the governing body for the sport of athletics in Montenegro.

Affiliations 
International Association of Athletics Federations (IAAF)
European Athletic Association (EAA)
Montenegrin Olympic Committee

National records 
ASCG maintains the Montenegrin records in athletics.

External links 
Official webpage 

Montenegro
Sports governing bodies in Montenegro
National governing bodies for athletics